This is a list of yearly Missouri Valley Football Conference standings.

Missouri Valley standings

Gateway Football Conference

Missouri Valley Football Conference

References

Missouri Valley Football Conference